The Bracco Group is an Italian multinational active in the healthcare sector with more than 3,300 employees worldwide, which operates in a variety of business areas.
Diagnostic imaging, with products for X-ray imaging, including computed tomography (CT), magnetic resonance imaging (MRI), ultrasound and nuclear medicine.
Contrast-agent injection systems and advanced medical devices.
Prescription and over-the-counter pharmaceuticals, supplements, medical and cosmetic devices developed and distributed in Italy.
Healthcare, prevention, diagnosis and rehabilitation services through the CDI - Centro Diagnostico Italiano.
Bracco has consolidated revenues of more than 1.1 billion euro, of which 75% from international sales. The Group is present in 100 countries and invests approximately 10% of its core diagnostic imaging revenues in research and innovation.
In Italy Bracco is also a brand associated with a number of historic pharmaceutical products such as Cebion, Xamamina, Euclorina, the Alfa eye-drops line and the Friliver range of sport supplements.

The Group Chairman and Chief Executive Officer is Diana Bracco. A chemistry graduate from the University of Pavia, Diana Bracco is also Chairman of Expo 2015 Spa, General Section Commissioner for the Italy Pavilion at Expo and Confindustria Vice President for Research & Innovation. Decorated as a Cavaliere del Lavoro, she was President of Assolombarda and, before that, Chairman of Federchimica. In February 2001 she received an Honorary Doctor of Pharmacy degree from University of Pavia.
On January 12, 2015, Diana Bracco was "prosecuted on charges of tax evasion and embezzlement, crimes allegedly committed as chairman of the board of the pharmaceutical group Bracco Spa." In October 2016, she was given a two year suspended sentence for tax fraud and embezzlement.

As of 2020, the group has a consolidated turnover of approximately 1.4 billion euros, of which 89% on foreign markets. It is present in 100 countries with 3,587 employees. The Bracco group has 1,800 patents, 7 research and development centers and 9 factories worldwide.

History
The company founded by Elio Bracco was established in 1927 in Milan with the name Società Italiana Prodotti E Merck, to produce, package and sell the chemical products of the German company E. Merck. It had just five employees.
In 1934 Fulvio Bracco, Elio's son, officially joined the company which, the same year, began marketing Cebion, an innovative product based on vitamin C, recently discovered by the Hungarian biochemist Albert Szent-Györgyi. In 1962 Bracco researchers created the first contrast agent based on their original research: iodamide, a product with very high tolerability.
On 17 March 1977 Diana Bracco, Fulvio's daughter, was appointed Bracco General Manager.

In 1981 the company launched Iopamidol in Italy and Germany. In the second half of the 1980s, Bracco Spa became the leading international producer of non-ionic contrast agents. It also won a positive response and important results for other formulations, including the anti-tuberculosis drug pyrazinamide, of which Bracco is the leading world producer, which is included in the WHO list of essential pharmaceuticals.

In 1990, Bracco began a ten-year period of important growth. At international level, acquisitions and joint ventures enhanced the Group structure. In 1990 the Bracco Eisai joint venture was set up in Japan. In 1994 Bracco acquired Squibb Diagnostic, a company in the Bristol Myers Squibb group in the United States, which is still Bracco Imaging's largest market today.
1995 saw the integration of the three research centres in Milan, Geneva and Princeton: Milan focuses on the research and development of contrast agents for radiology and magnetic resonance, Bracco Research Geneva on ultrasound and Bracco Research USA Princeton on magnetic resonance and nuclear medicine.

1999 was a milestone year for the company: the Bracco family and the Merck Group reached an agreement under which Bracco bought Merck's 50% stake in the Group's diagnostic and pharmaceuticals operations.
In 2001, the Bracco Group acquired ACIST Medical Systems, a US company based in Eden Prairie, Minnesota, a suburb of Minneapolis, active in advanced contrast-agent management and injection systems.
Meanwhile, the Group's international growth continued, with more offices opening around the world. Since 2002 Bracco has had a direct presence in China with Bracco Sine Pharmaceutical Corp. Ltd. in Shanghai. In 2008 it acquired E-Z-EM, a leading company in the radiology sector. In 2010 Bracco entered Estonia, Scandinavia and South Korea. In 2011 Bracco Imaging acquired Swiss Medical Care (now Bracco Injeneering) and the Nycomed production plants in Singen (Germany). In 2012 it completed the acquisitions of Justesa in Argentina, Mexico and Brazil.

Gruppo Companies

Bracco S.p.A. - Milan (Italy)
Bracco Imaging S.p.A. - Milan (Italy)
Bracco Imaging Italia S.p.A.- Italia- Milan (Italy)
SPIN  S.p.A. - Torviscosa (Italy)
Centro Diagnostico Italiano S.p.A. - Milan (Italy)
Bracco Imaging Europe BV - (Netherlands)
Bracco Imaging Europe BV - (Belgium)
Bracco Suisse S.A. (Switzerland)
Bracco International BV (Netherlands)
Bracco Imaging Polska- (Poland)
Bracco Imaging Czech- (Czech Republic)
Bracco Imaging Deutschland GmbH- (Germany)
Bracco Imaging BV- (France)
Bracco UK  Ltd.  (United Kingdom)
Bracco Oesterreich GmbH (Austria)
Bracco Imaging France SAS (France)
Bracco Imaging Scandinavia AB (Sweden)
Bracco Imaging Baltics (Estonia)
ACIST Europe B.V (Netherlands)
BIPSO - (Germany)
Bracco Imaging Slovakia- (Slovakia)
Bracco Injeneering - (Switzerland)
Bracco Research U.S.A. Inc.-  (United States)
Bracco  Diagnostics Inc. - (United States)
ACIST Medical Systems, Inc - (United States)
E-Z-EM Canada (Bracco Imaging Canada) - (Canada)
Bracco Imaging do Brasil importaçao e distribuçao de medicamentos L.tda - (Brasil)
Justesa Imagen Mexicana S.A. de C.V- (Mexico)
Bracco  Diagnostics Asia, Pty- (Singapore)
Bracco International BV-  - (China)
Bracco Eisai  Co. Ltd.-  (Japan)
Shanghai Bracco Sine Pharmaceutical Corp. Ltd. (China)
Bracco Far East Ltd.- (China)
Bracco Far East Ltd. – (Hong Kong)
Bracco Imaging Korea Ltd. – (South Korea)
ACIST Asia Pte Ltd – (Singapore)

References 

Multinational companies headquartered in Italy
Chemical companies of Italy
Pharmaceutical companies of Italy
Pharmaceutical companies established in 1927
Manufacturing companies based in Milan
Italian companies established in 1927
Italian brands